Darshan Gandas, known by his stage name Darshan Kumar, is an Indian actor who appears primarily in Hindi films. He made his debut with the film Mary Kom (2014), opposite Priyanka Chopra, as a male lead. He is best known for the 2022 film, The Kashmir Files, in which he starred as a young student from a Kashmiri Pandit family.

Biography
Kumar comes from a Hindu Jat family at Kishangarh Village Mehrauli in South Delhi. At the age of 24, he moved to Mumbai and worked with Sahej theatre group for five years.

Career
Kumar was asked to audition for the film Mary Kom by the casting director of the film.

Also, he worked in TV series Devon Ke Dev...Mahadev, playing Shukracharya, the guru of the demons. Kumar's first movie was NH10, with Anushka Sharma but, it was Mary Kom, with Priyanka Chopra that was released first.

Filmography

Television

Films

Web series

References

External links

Male actors from New Delhi
Living people
Male actors in Hindi cinema
International Indian Film Academy Awards winners
Year of birth missing (living people)